"Liar" is a song by  Rollins Band and the lead single from their fourth album, Weight, released in 1994. It was the album's only charting single and is one of the group's best known songs.

Background
In 2011, Rollins reported that "Liar" began during one of the first practice jam sessions with bassist Melvin Gibbs who joined in 1993, replacing Andrew Weiss. "Liar" was a loose, humorous improvisation performed at live concerts until executives at Imago Records suggested the song had the potential to be a hit single. Rollins thought the song was a b-side that would not even be featured on Weight. However, when the record label heard it they immediately  proposed it be the lead single.

Both a short edit (4:19) and a longer "video edit" (4:49) were distributed as CD singles in various territories, often with one or more unreleased tracks from the Weight sessions added; these and other outtakes were included in the 2004 release Weighting.

The video edit of "Liar" was featured in the song's music video and features a different vocal track and slightly different lyrics in the opening section. The song's lyrics are from the perspective of a serial liar who alternates between declarations of sympathy and friendship on the one hand, then repeatedly gloating celebrations of his deceptions. Directed by Anton Corbijn, the video itself features alternating depictions of vocalist Henry Rollins. During the song's verses, he wears glasses and a plain black T-shirt and speaks in a calm, soothing tone about trust and friendship; from one verse to the next, his arms and face become increasingly stained with black paint. For the chorus segments, he is shirtless and painted red, wildly jumping and flailing about as he screams derisively at his audience for believing his lies. He is also seen dressed in a Superman parody costume, a police officer uniform, and a nun's habit.

Reception and legacy
Upon release, the "Liar" video gained heavy airplay on MTV. This led to it appearing as part of the Beavis and Butt-head episode "Liar! Liar!", which aired on July 15, 1994. In the episode, Beavis becomes excited about the chorus, repeating the word "Liar!" in the same way he typically says "Fire! Fire! Fire!". Butt-head comes to the conclusion that "lying rules."

"Liar" was named the 64th best hard rock song of all time by VH1.  It was nominated for the Grammy Award for Best Metal Performance.  Rollins Band performed the song at the 37th Grammy Awards Ceremony. In 2019, former Headbangers Ball host Riki Rachtman ranked it fifth on his list of the "10 Best Metal Videos Of The '90s."

Accolades

Charts

References

Rollins Band songs
1994 songs
1994 singles
Music videos directed by Anton Corbijn
Imago Records singles